Bob Bartolomeo is a former American football player and coach. In 2018, he retired as the head football coach at the University of Indianapolis, a position he had held since 2010. Bartolomeo served as the head football coach at Butler University in Indianapolis from 1990 to 1991.

Head coaching record

References

Year of birth missing (living people)
Living people
Ball State Cardinals football coaches
Butler Bulldogs football coaches
Butler Bulldogs football players
Central Michigan Chippewas football coaches
Indianapolis Greyhounds football coaches